Karimeh (also Romanized as Karīmeh) is a village in Jaydasht Rural District, in the Central District of Firuzabad County, Fars Province, Iran. At the 2006 census, its population was 55, in 13 families.

References 

Populated places in Firuzabad County